Planet Miners (sometimes  The Planet Miners) is a  game published by the Microcomputer Games division of Avalon Hill for the TRS-80 Level II microcomputer in 1980. It was ported to the Atari 8-bit family, Apple II, and Commodore PET. The game is written in BASIC.

Plot summary
Planet Miners is a game that involves four corporations trying to control the mining rights on the nine planets of Earth's solar system.

Reception
Joseph T. Suchar reviewed Planet Miners in The Space Gamer No. 32. Suchar commented that "Overall I found it tedious. I would not recommend it."

Reviews
Moves #57, p15-16

References

External links

Review in 80 Micro
Review in The Addison Wesley Book Of Atari Software 1984
Review in Creative Computing

1980 video games
Avalon Hill video games
Apple II games
Atari 8-bit family games
Commodore PET games
TRS-80 games
Video games developed in the United States